Lazenby railway station served the village of Lazenby, North Yorkshire, England, from 1846 to 1864 on the Middlesbrough and Redcar Railway.

History 
The station was opened to the public on 5 June 1846 by the Middlesbrough and Redcar Railway, although it had opened a day earlier for a VIP special and an excursion. It closed in May 1864. It erroneously appeared in the 1867 and 1872 editions of the handbook of stations.

References 

Disused railway stations in North Yorkshire
Railway stations in Great Britain opened in 1846
Railway stations in Great Britain closed in 1864
1846 establishments in England
1864 disestablishments in England